Mishab may refer to:

Mishab, Isfahan
Mishab, Kurdistan
Mishab-e Shomali Rural District, in East Azerbaijan Province